Varsallona is a surname. Notable people with the surname include:

Francesco Paolo Varsallona, Italian bandit
Pat Varsallona, Italian footballer